Lampruna punctata is a moth of the subfamily Arctiinae. It was described by Walter Rothschild in 1909. It is found in Peru.

References

Phaegopterina
Moths of South America
Moths described in 1909
Taxa named by Walter Rothschild